Kelvin Moore (born 25 March 1984) is a former Australian rules football player. He last played for the Richmond Football Club.

Whilst injuries held back most of his early career, Moore secured a spot in the Tigers' defence in season 2008. His athletic abilities combined with his toughness made him a valuable asset to Richmond's backline, often playing on much bigger forwards.

Injury kept Moore from playing any games in the 2011 season.

On 16 August 2012, after playing just 3 matches for the year, and missing out on almost two years of AFL action, Moore, along with his Tigers teammate Brad Miller, announced his retirement, effective immediately. He left the club having played 87 games and booting 12 goals. After 685 days of being off field Moore made a comeback in 2012 against the Gold Coast Suns in a game that Richmond lost after a goal after the siren by Karmichael Hunt.

References

External links

Richmond Football Club players
Living people
1984 births
Australian rules footballers from Melbourne
Coburg Football Club players
People from Mitcham, Victoria